Francesco Cornaro may refer to:

 Francesco Cornaro (1478–1543), Italian cardinal
 Francesco Cornaro (1547–1598), Italian cardinal
 Francesco Cornaro (Doge) (1585–1656), Doge of Venice

See also
 House of Cornaro